César Alvarenga (died June 24, 2018) was a Paraguayan politician who served as the Governor of San Pedro Department from 1998 until 1999. He also served as the Mayor of Choré and a Choré District councilor.

Alvarenga, who suffered from health problems, died of a heart attack at his home in Choré, Paraguay, on June 24, 2018.

References

Date of birth unknown
20th-century births
2018 deaths
Governors of San Pedro Department, Paraguay
Mayors of places in Paraguay
People from San Pedro Department, Paraguay